Rahul Roushan (born 29 January 1980) is an Indian blogger and businessman. Roushan founded Faking News, a satirical news website, and is the CEO of OpIndia, a right-wing news portal that has been found publishing fake news on multiple occasions. Originally from Patna, he is now based in Mumbai and is an alumnus of Indian Institute of Mass Communication and IIM-A.

He served as the editor of Faking News until 2016 and previously also worked as chief strategy officer for Swarajya, a conservative Indian magazine.

In March 2020, he published his autobiography titled "Sanghi Who Never Went To A Shakha." The book received positive reception from many including Kangana Ranaut, Vivek Ranjan Agnihotri and Madhav Sharma.

Life 
Roushan comes from the city of Patna in Bihar. He graduated in Mathematics from Patna University in year 2001, and then received a postgraduate diploma in broadcast journalism from the Indian Institute of Mass Communication (IIMC) in New Delhi in 2002. Roushan is also an alumnus of IIM Ahmedabad with a Post Graduate Diploma in Management granted in 2007. Roushan is settled in Mumbai, where he lives with his wife, with who he has a daughter.

Career
After graduating from IIMC, Roushan worked as a copy editor, bulletin producer, and news anchor with the Hindi news channel Sahara Samay for two and a half years. He left journalism to pursue higher studies at IIM Ahmedabad, wherein he turned an entrepreneur.

While still being a student, he had launched crickstock.com, a virtual gaming website, ahead of the 2007 Cricket World Cup. Crickstock.com was later sold off to a US based online gaming company and Roushan chose a freelancing career as management consultant; one of his projects included helping the Bihar government set up a management institute in Patna, in 2008.

In 2008, inspired by the American news satire website The Onion, Roushan started Faking News as a blog and wrote under the pseudonym Pagal Patrakaar (crazy journalist). In 2009, the blog was turned into a full-fledged website. In 2013, Faking News was acquired by Firstpost, a news portal of the Network 18 group, for an undisclosed amount. Roushan went on to serve as its editor till September 2016, when he switched to Swarajya as Chief Strategy Officer.

In November 2018, he became the CEO of a spin-off digital media startup – Aadhyaasi Media & Content Services, which took over the production of OpIndia from Swarajya. Ideologically oriented towards right-wing populism, OpIndia claims to be a fact-checking website, but has published fake news on multiple occasions. In May 2019, the International Fact-Checking Network (IFCN), an affiliate of the Poynter Institute, rejected Roushan's application to have OpIndia certified as a fact checker.

Influence
Priyanka Sharma wrote in the Business Standard that several authors followed Roushan's lead to start similar ventures as Faking News, including the founders of newsthatmattersnot.com and The UnReal Times.

References

21st-century Indian journalists
Hindi journalists
Indian satirists
21st-century Indian businesspeople
1980 births
Living people